Club Polideportivo La Roda, also known as JAFEP Fundación Globalcaja La Roda for sponsorship reasons, is the basketball team of the Spanish namesake multi-sports club based in La Roda, Albacete. It currently plays in LEB Plata.

History
In the 1980s, CP La Roda reached for the first time the fourth tier, where it remained during four years before declining.

The club came back years later and started in the Provincial League, coming back finally to Tercera División, fourth tier, in 1989. Four years later, La Roda achieved the promotion to Segunda División, where it played continuously until 2002 (the league changed its name to Primera División in 1999) when the club was relegated to Primera Autonómica. One year later, it came back to Primera División for playing during 12 years before promoting to Liga EBA.

La Roda was relegated again to Primera División in its debut in a national league but remained in the league after the expansion of their group from 14 to 16 teams. In the next season, they ended in the fourth position and qualified for the promotion stage thanks to the resignation of Real Madrid B. Surprisingly, the club achieved the promotion to LEB Plata on 22 May 2017 after winning the three games of the final stage.

In their debut season, the club surprisingly qualified to the Copa LEB Plata by finishing in the second place after the first half of the regular season. It also ended in the second place of the table at the end of this stage, but was quickly eliminated in the promotion playoffs by Real Canoe. Their second season was completely different and La Roda ended in the relegation positions to Liga EBA.

Season by season

Current roster

References

External links
Basketball team at the official website 
Profile at FEB.es

Basketball teams established in 1960
Basketball teams in Castilla–La Mancha
LEB Plata teams
Former Liga EBA teams
1960 establishments in Spain
Province of Albacete